What I Was Made For is the fourth studio album by the American contemporary Christian music band Big Daddy Weave. This was their third release with a major label in Fervent Records. It was released on July 26, 2005. This album charted on the following Billboard's charts on August 13, 2005:  No. 14 on Christian Albums, and No. 17 on Top Heatseekers.

Track listing

Personnel 

Big Daddy Weave
 Mike Weaver – lead and backing vocals, acoustic guitars
 Jeremy Redmon – electric guitars, keyboards (10), programming (10)
 Jay Weaver – bass guitar 
 Jeff Jones – drums 
 Joe Shirk – saxophone

Additional musicians
 Jeff Roach – keyboards, acoustic piano 
 Ken Lewis – percussion 
 David Davidson – string arrangements 
 Otto Price – arrangements (5)
 Anna Redmon – backing vocals 
 BarlowGirl – lead and backing vocals (5)
 Fred Hammond – lead and backing vocals (8)

Production
 Jeremy Redmon – producer (1-4, 6-11), engineer (1-4, 6-11), overdub recording (1-4, 6-11)
 Mike Weaver – producer (1-4, 6-11)
 Otto Price – producer (5), engineer (5)
 Susan Riley – executive producer
 Shane D. Wilson – engineer (1-4, 6-11), mixing (1-4, 6-11), digital editing (1-4, 6-11)
 Chris Henning – assistant engineer (1-4, 6-11), mix assistant (1-4, 6-11)
 Michael Morena – assistant engineer (5)
 Keith Willis – assistant engineer (5)
 Jim Dineen – percussion engineer, string engineer 
 Baheo "Bobby" Shin – string engineer
 Bryan Lenox – mixing (5)
 Rob Hawkins – digital editing (5), production assistant (5)
 Brad Blackwood – mastering  
 Boyhowdy – art direction, design 
 Amy Dickerson – photography 
 Emily West – stylist, wardrobe

References

External links
Official album page

2005 albums
Big Daddy Weave albums
Fervent Records albums